Coolumburra is a locality in the City of Shoalhaven in New South Wales, Australia. It lies on the Braidwood Road on the Endrick River between Nowra and Nerriga. This road continues southwest to Braidwood, but this involves a section of unsealed road. The sealed Oallen Ford Road branches off south of Nerriga, which connects via various sealed roads to Canberra and Goulburn. Coolumburra is heavily forested and part lies within the Morton National Park.

References

City of Shoalhaven
Localities in New South Wales